Soil was a British indie pop group, formed in Manchester in 1984, by North Manchester school-friends, Kevin Siddall (songwriter/guitar), Lee Bennett (bass guitar) and Rob Kerford (drums), and University of Manchester student, Matthew Karas (songwriter/vocals/keyboards/harmonica). Kerford left the group, just before the first gig, and Matthew's neighbour, Ravi Low-Beer, stood in on drums.

Low-Beer, Kerford and guitarist, Siddall, all played drums on the four song cassette, Too Ill to Close the Door, which was duplicated and distributed by the group, and reviewed in City Life and the Manchester Evening News. After auditioning a few drummers, Gary Farrell, from Stretford, joined the group.

In this line-up, Soil supported The Smiths in Kilburn, on 23 October 1986, at Morrissey's invitation. This was the concert at which The Smiths' live album, Rank, was recorded. Karas had given Morrissey a cassette during a chance encounter, and received a postcard shortly afterwards.

In the same year, Soil played at venues around Manchester, and regularly appeared at The Boardwalk. They also supported Easterhouse on a short UK tour.

Their only release was a flexi-single on the cover of Debris fanzine, edited by Dave Haslam. The track, "Front Room". was played on BBC Radio 1 by John Peel several times, as well as on the local radio stations, BBC Radio Manchester and Red Rose Radio. 
Karas and Siddall recorded three jingles for the BBC Radio Manchester show, Meltdown, which were played weekly for several months.

Soon after the Smiths concert, both Farrell and Bennett left the group. Karas and Siddall played one concert with a backing tape, before recruiting bass guitarist, Phil Morris, and drummer, Ged O'Brien, who played at their final performance at The Boardwalk in 1987.

Karas and Siddall have written and recorded sporadically since 1987, but have not released anything or performed in public. They played a short set in 2013, at Karas' 50th birthday party.

Karas played bass guitar and harmonica with The Fallen Leaves from 2009 until 2021, and has been playing various instruments, writing and arranging with Glassglue since 2003.

Discography

Cassette EP
 Too Ill to Close the Door (1985)

Singles
 "Front Room" (1986), Debris

References

External links
 Official web site
 Biography from Manchester District Music Archive

Musical groups from Manchester
British indie pop groups